Nicolas Andrés Córdova San Cristóbal (born 9 February 1979) is a Chilean football manager and former footballer. He is the manager of Al-Rayyan.

Playing career
Córdova began his career in Colo-Colo of Chile in the top flight. He played from 1997 until 2001 playing 54 matches and scoring three goals.

In the 2004–05 season, he played Livorno. In September 2008, he was signed for Grosseto.

At international level, he represented Chile U20 in the 1999 South American Championship, and to the Chile senior team  five times. He also won the L'Alcúdia Tournament in 1998, alongside players such as Claudio Maldonado and Luis Mena.

International goals

Coaching career
Córdova began his professional managerial career with the Chile U20 in 2015, winning the L'Alcúdia Tournament.

On 13 February 2022, he was appointed interim coach of Al-Rayyan in Qatar. In June 2022, he was confirmed as the manager of Al-Rayyan.

Statistics

Honours

Player
Colo-Colo
Primera División de Chile (2): 1997 Clausura, 1998

Chile U20
 L'Alcúdia International Tournament (1): 1998

Manager
Chile U20
 L'Alcúdia International Tournament (1): 2015

Santiago Wanderers
Copa Chile (1): 2017

References

External links
 

1979 births
Living people
People from Talca
Chilean footballers
Chilean expatriate footballers
Chile international footballers
Chile under-20 international footballers
Colo-Colo footballers
Unión Española footballers
A.C. Perugia Calcio players
F.C. Crotone players
S.S.C. Bari players
U.S. Livorno 1915 players
Ascoli Calcio 1898 F.C. players
A.C.R. Messina players
F.C. Grosseto S.S.D. players
Parma Calcio 1913 players
Brescia Calcio players
Chilean Primera División players
Serie A players
Serie B players
Expatriate footballers in Italy
Chilean expatriate sportspeople in Italy
Chilean football managers
Chilean expatriate football managers
Chile national under-20 football team managers
Club Deportivo Palestino managers
Santiago Wanderers managers
Club Universitario de Deportes managers
Al-Rayyan SC managers
Chilean Primera División managers
Primera B de Chile managers
Peruvian Primera División managers
Qatar Stars League managers
Expatriate football managers in Peru
Chilean expatriate sportspeople in Peru
Expatriate football managers in Qatar
Chilean expatriate sportspeople in Qatar
Association football midfielders